Catherine Fabre (born 19 September 1978) is a French politician of La République En Marche! (LREM) who has been serving as a member of the French National Assembly since the 2017 elections, representing the 2nd constituency of the department of Gironde.

Political career
In Parliament, Fabre serves as member of the Committee on Social Affairs. In this capacity, she has been her parliamentary group's rapporteur on pensions reform since 2019.

In addition to her committee assignments, Fabre is part of the parliamentary friendship groups with Cambodia and Sweden.

In 2020, Fabre joined En commun (EC), a group within LREM led by Barbara Pompili.

Political positions
In July 2019, Fabre voted in favour of the French ratification of the European Union’s Comprehensive Economic and Trade Agreement (CETA) with Canada.

References

1978 births
Living people
Politicians from Toulouse
Women members of the National Assembly (France)
La République En Marche! politicians
21st-century French women politicians
Deputies of the 15th National Assembly of the French Fifth Republic
Politicians from Nouvelle-Aquitaine